The 2015–16 season was Southend United's 110th year in existence and their first season back in League One after gaining promotion the previous season. Along with competing in League One, the club also participated in the FA Cup, League Cup and Football League Trophy. The season covers the period from 1 July 2015 to 30 June 2016.

Transfers

Transfers in

Transfers out

Loans in

Competitions

Pre-season friendlies
On 3 June 2015, Southend United announced their first confirmed pre-season friendly against Charlton Athletic. On 8 June 2015, a friendly against West Ham United. On 11 June 2015, a further two friendlies were announced. Also a trip to Dagenham & Redbridge was confirmed.

League One

League table

Result by matchday

Matches
On 17 June 2015, the fixtures for the forthcoming season were announced.

FA Cup
On 26th Oct 2015, in the clubhouse of Thackley Juniors FC in West Yorkshire, Southend United were drawn away against Scunthorpe United, to create an earlier travel date to Glanford Park.

League Cup
On 16 June 2015, the first round draw was made, Southend United were drawn at home against Brighton & Hove Albion.

Football League Trophy
On 5 September 2015, the second round draw was shown live on Soccer AM and drawn by Charlie Austin and Ed Skrein. Southend will travel to Crawley Town.

References

Southend United
Southend United F.C. seasons